Suva is the capital of Fiji.

Suva may also refer to:

 Suva (insurer), the Swiss National Accident Insurance Fund
 , a ship
 Specific ultraviolet absorbance, a measure of dissolved organic carbon in water
 Suva Planina, town in Serbia
 Suva Reka, town in Kosovo
 Suva River, Crni Timok (Bogovina), a tributary of the Crni Timok River near the village of Bogovina, Serbia
 Suva River, Crni Timok (Metovnica), a tributary of the Crni Timok River near the village of Metovnica, Serbia